Greiser is a surname. Notable people with the surname include:

 Arthur Greiser (1897–1946), German politician
 Caitlin Greiser (born 1999), Australian rules footballer 
 Dirk Greiser (born 1963), German footballer

German-language surnames